The American elm cultivar Ulmus americana 'New Harmony' was raised by the Maryland Agricultural Research Service and released by the United States National Arboretum in 1995, along with 'Valley Forge'. 'New Harmony' proved the most successful U. americana cultivar in the US National Elm Trial, averaging a survival rate of 85.5% overall.

Description
'New Harmony' is considered by some to have a more desirable form than 'Valley Forge' as it grows vertically on its own with a minimum of early training. The original parent tree (located on a roadside in Ohio) is already over 20 m high, with a slightly greater crown spread. The bole divides into several erect branches about 10 m above the ground terminating in slender, pendulous branchlets.

Growth is rapid, young trees gaining in height by almost 1.7 m per annum in trials at U C Davis, although d.b.h. increase remained a modest 1.8 cm.

Pests and diseases
Although resistant to Dutch elm disease and Elm Leaf Beetle Xanthogaleruca luteola, like most other American Elm cultivars 'New Harmony' is susceptible to Elm Yellows and Japanese Beetle Popillia japonica. In the trials at U C Davis, the trees remained free of leaf curling aphids (Eriosoma), unlike its U. americana stablemates 'Valley Forge' and 'Princeton'.

Cultivation
'New Harmony' is currently being evaluated in the National Elm Trial  coordinated by Colorado State University. 
The tree was introduced to the UK in 2010.

Etymology
The tree is named for the Indiana town renowned for its social innovations in the 19th century.

Accessions
North America
Bartlett Tree Experts, US. Acc. nos. 2001-233, 2001-446.
Brenton Arboretum, Dallas Center, Iowa, US. No details available.
Longwood Gardens, US. Acc. nos. 2000-0361, 2002-0412, 2004–0674.
Morton Arboretum, Illinois, US. Acc. no. 124-2008.
U S National Arboretum , Washington, D.C., US. Acc. no. 29003.
Europe
Grange Farm Arboretum, Sutton St. James, Spalding, Lincolnshire, UK. Whips planted 2011. Acc. no. 1055.
Netherlands Plant Collection, Ulmus: Gemeentehuis, Rading 1, Loosdrecht, gemeente Wijdemeren, planted 2016.

References

External links
http://www.elmpost.org/2003-08.htm Photograph of New Harmony elms in their original test plot, showing their form of growth.
http://www.extension.iastate.edu/Publications/SUL4.pdf Summary, including photographs, of elm cultivars resistant to Dutch elm disease available in the United States.
http://www.sunshinenursery.com/elms.htm Review of current elm selections in the United States.
https://web.archive.org/web/20061205022500/http://www.ces.ncsu.edu/fletcher/programs/nursery/metria/metria11/warren/elm.htm Return of the Elm -the status of elms in the nursery industry in 2000. Warren, K., J. Frank Schmidt and Co.

American elm cultivar
Ulmus articles missing images
Ulmus